Ronald Ford (born 7 September 1942) is an Australian judoka. He competed in the men's lightweight event at the 1964 Summer Olympics.

References

External links
 

1942 births
Living people
Australian male judoka
Olympic judoka of Australia
Judoka at the 1964 Summer Olympics
Place of birth missing (living people)